An oil clique is a social clique or a network of powerful individuals and institutions that are involved in the petroleum industry. Important examples include China's oil clique and Texas' oil clique.

References

Petroleum politics
Lobbying in the United States
Politics of China